Christian Friedrich Krattenthaler (born 8 October 1958 in Vienna) is an Austrian mathematician. He is a professor of discrete mathematics (with a focus on combinatorics). From 2016 to 2020 he has been the Dean of the Faculty of Mathematics at the University of Vienna.

He received his doctoral degree sub auspiciis Praesidentis rei publicae at the University of Vienna in 1983 under Johann Cigler with the dissertation Lagrangeformel und inverse Relationen (Lagrangian formula and inverse relations). Krattenthaler worked at various universities, including the University of California, San Diego, the Mathematical Sciences Research Institute in Berkeley, California, the University of Strasbourg, and the Claude Bernard University Lyon 1 before being appointed to a professorship at the University of Vienna in 2005.

His area of specialization is the problems of combinatorial enumeration, such as those in algebra, algebraic geometry, number theory, computer science, or statistical physics.

Krattenthaler won in 1990 the Prize of the Austrian Mathematical Society and in 2007 the Wittgenstein Award of the Austrian Science Fund. He was elected in 2005 a corresponding member of the Austrian Academy of Sciences, in 2011 a full member of the Academia Europaea, and in 2012 a Fellow of the American Mathematical Society. In 2015 he received a
Docteur honoris causa from the Université Sorbonne Paris Nord.

Krattenthaler is also a trained concert pianist, but had to abandon his musical career because of repetitive strain injury in his hands.

References

External links
 
 
  (2016 International Conference of Number Theory in honor of Krishna Alladi's 60th birthday)

Austrian mathematicians
University of Vienna alumni
Academic staff of the University of Vienna
Fellows of the American Mathematical Society
Members of the Austrian Academy of Sciences
Members of Academia Europaea
1958 births
Living people